JKV may refer to:

 Cherokee County Airport (Texas)
 Jyothy Kendriya Vidyalaya, a school in Bangalore
 , a train protection system used in Finland; see Rail transport in Finland